The Canadian Premier League (CPL or CanPL) is a professional men's football league in Canada. At the top of the Canadian soccer league system, it is the country's primary national soccer league competition. The league consists of eight teams, from five of Canada's ten provinces. Each team plays 28 games in the regular season which is followed by playoffs culminating in the CPL Finals.

The CPL champion and regular season winner earn berths in the CONCACAF Champions League, competing against teams from across North America, Central America and the Caribbean for a spot in the FIFA Club World Cup. All CPL teams also play in the Canadian Championship, alongside Canadian clubs from other leagues. Qualification for the CONCACAF Champions League is also available to CPL clubs by winning the Canadian Championship.

The league was officially sanctioned by the Canadian Soccer Association on May 6, 2017, and has played an annual season since 2019. The league's focus is to improve national soccer talent and the sport in Canada, with several rules in place to ensure this. These include a minimum quota of Canadian players on team rosters and starting line-ups, requirements for domestic under-21 players, and a Canadian university draft.

The CPL's first season included seven teams, while an eighth, Atlético Ottawa, joined for the second season in 2020. Vancouver FC is scheduled to debut in 2023, while FC Edmonton folded before the start of that season. The CPL is headquartered in Toronto, Ontario.

History

Since the closure of the original Canadian Soccer League in 1992, there was no fully professional first division domestic league of Canadian soccer. The only national Canadian competition was the Canadian Championship, a domestic cup which has been played since 2008. Canadian teams played in American leagues, such as Major League Soccer, NASL and the USL Championship, while the L1O and PLSQ were created as provincial-level leagues. A new version of the Canadian Soccer League was briefly sanctioned as a third-division semi-pro league by the CSA from 2010 to 2013, losing the sanction after the CSA board of directors adopted a new soccer structure in Canada.

A new fully professional Canadian soccer league was first publicly reported in June 2013. The reports suggested that Hamilton Tiger-Cats owner Bob Young was part of a core group of investors working with the Canadian Soccer Association and its president Victor Montagliani to create a new set of fully professional teams or a league in Canada. The Tiger-Cats ownership group was granted exclusive rights by the Canadian Soccer Association until 2017 to establish a team that would play in the under-construction Tim Hortons Field in Hamilton.

In February 2016, reports of the league emerged again when Young spoke to Hamilton City Council requesting permission to erect an air-dome over the Tim Hortons Field playing surface between December 1 and April 30 yearly to allow for year-round training for a professional soccer team owned by the Tiger-Cats that would call the stadium home. During questions by the elected council members, it was revealed that the name of the league would be the Canadian Premier League and that the Hamilton team was expected to be the flagship franchise. Further details were expected following the Canadian Soccer Association's annual meeting in May 2016. Reports in June 2016 indicated that the Canadian Premier League would avoid current Major League Soccer markets.

On November 14, the first official employee of the Canadian Premier League was announced. Paul Beirne, a Canadian who was also the first employee of Toronto FC, was hired as project manager for the new league. On May 6, 2017, the creation of the league was unanimously approved and sanctioned by the Canadian Soccer Association. Ownership groups in Winnipeg and Hamilton were also approved. On May 5 2018, the Canadian Soccer Association accepted club memberships for Halifax, York Region, Calgary, and "Port City" (later confirmed to be based in Greater Victoria, rather than Surrey as speculated).

The unveiling of the first team, York9 FC, took place on May 10. This was followed by Calgary-based Cavalry FC on May 17, 2018, Halifax's HFX Wanderers FC on May 25, Valour FC in Winnipeg on June 6, and the rebranded former NASL side FC Edmonton on June 8. After a break from announcements to accommodate the 2018 FIFA World Cup, Hamilton's Forge FC was next unveiled on July 12, followed by Pacific FC of Langford in Greater Victoria on July 20.

On August 27, 2018, the CPL announced that it would hold a series of open tryouts in eight cities across Canada for players age 16 and older. The tryouts were led by Alex Bunbury and took place in front of CPL coaching staff from all teams. On September 28, 2018, Italian sportswear company Macron was announced as the official apparel supplier of the CPL. Macron supplies training gear and custom made kits for each CPL team.

Launch (2019–present)
The inaugural match of the Canadian Premier League between Forge FC and York9 FC took place at Tim Hortons Field on April 27, 2019, and resulted in a 1–1 draw. Ryan Telfer of York9 FC scored the first goal in Canadian Premier League history in the third minute of the inaugural match.

In advance of the 2019 Finals, the league's trophy was unveiled. The North Star Shield is a crystal shield engraved with the logo of the Canadian Premier League. The inaugural season finished on November 2, 2019, when Forge FC became the first Canadian Premier League Champions, defeating Cavalry FC 2–0 over two legs in the Finals. Forge midfielder Tristan Borges was named the first CPL Player of the Year.

On January 29, 2020, Atlético Ottawa was confirmed to be the first CPL expansion team, joining for the 2020 season. The 2020 season, set to start on April 11, was postponed indefinitely due to the COVID-19 pandemic. On July 29, it was announced that the entire 2020 season would be played in Charlottetown beginning August 13. The shortened 2020 season, known as "The Island Games" ended on September 19 when Forge FC won their second Canadian Premier League title in a 2–0 victory over HFX Wanderers.

The 2021 season did not begin until June 26 due to the COVID-19 pandemic; however, each team was able to play a full schedule of 28 matches. The season culminated with Pacific FC defeating Forge FC 1–0 in the 2021 Final, held in December.

On November 21, 2022, the Canadian Premier League announced that FC Edmonton would be removed from the league, effective immediately. The league commissioner cited poor on-field performance as well as low attendance and an outdated stadium as reasons for the termination.

Competition format

The inaugural 2019 season of the league included a split season format similar to soccer leagues in Latin America. The winners of the two seasons competed in the two-legged CPL Finals.

With the addition of an eighth club in 2020, the league moved to a single season format with expanded playoffs. The Canadian Premier League regular season runs from April to October. Each team plays 28 games, including 14 at home and 14 away games. The top four teams in the regular season qualify for the playoffs to determine which two teams play in the final.

On multiple occasions, then league commissioner David Clanachan stated his goal of having promotion and relegation in the Canadian soccer league system as more teams join the league.

Other competitions featuring CPL clubs 

All Canadian Premier League teams also participate in Canada's domestic cup competition – the Canadian Championship. CPL teams compete against Canadian teams in Major League Soccer and Tier 3 league champions for a berth in the CONCACAF Champions League. Beginning in 2023, the CPL regular season and playoff champion also qualify for the Champions League.

From 2019 to 2022, one CPL club participated in the CONCACAF League and competed against teams from Central America and the Caribbean for one of six spots in the CONCACAF Champions League. For the 2019 edition only, this slot was granted to one of the league's 'inaugural teams' (FC Edmonton, Forge FC, or Valour FC) based on their home and away matches in the 2019 spring season. In all other editions, the berth was awarded to the previous year's playoff champion.

Forge FC represented the CPL in CONCACAF League on three occasions. In the 2021 CONCACAF League, Forge advanced to the semi-finals of the competition to qualify for the 2022 CONCACAF Champions League, becoming the first CPL club to do so.

Clubs 

Eight clubs compete in the Canadian Premier League. Seven clubs competed in the inaugural season. Only FC Edmonton predated the CPL, having been members of the North American Soccer League, and also having competed in the Canadian Championship seven times before joining the league. The league expanded to eight teams with the addition of Atlético Ottawa in 2020. For 2023, Vancouver FC was added as an expansion club, while FC Edmonton was dissolved, keeping the league at eight clubs. 

The province of Ontario has three teams, British Columbia has two clubs, while Alberta, Manitoba and Nova Scotia each have one. There is one pair of rivalries between teams in the same province: the 905 Derby between Forge FC and York United FC, named after the area code shared by both teams.

Notes

Timeline

Notes

&ast; indicates championship winning season

Future teams

Expansion 

While CPL commissioner, David Clanachan expressed, on numerous occasions, the league's plans to expand gradually up to 16 clubs in 2026. Clanachan also stated that the biggest issue for potential expansion teams is lack of facilities. Clanachan mentioned that the league was looking at regions and owners in St. John's, Moncton, Laval, Quebec City, Kitchener-Waterloo, the Niagara Region, the Durham Region, Mississauga, Regina, Saskatoon, and Kelowna as well as the Fraser Valley area of British Columbia. Other areas with CPL interest include Barrie, Montreal, and Saint John.

On August 25, 2022, Soccer Quebec's general director Philippe Bernard was quoted in Le Journal de Québec announcing that Léger Marketing had been commissioned to launch a market study to verify interest in the province for a CPL team. He also confirmed that Soccer Quebec had determined that Quebec City was the best market in the province for a new team. Although there isn't an ownership group yet, Bernard explained that the market study would help facilitate investment in a new team.

Also in 2022, the CPL began considering a "serious expansion bid" for Kelowna that includes a multi-use development proposal for a stadium site at the city's Recreation Avenue Park.

Ottawa

It had been speculated that then-existing USL Championship side Ottawa Fury FC would join the league for its 2019 or 2020 season; speculation fuelled by the Fury's acquisitions of Canadian players prior to the 2018 season. While the club remained in the USL for 2019, two of the three governing bodies of the USL (United States Soccer Federation and CONCACAF) refused to sanction the Canadian club to continue play in the US league, and the club ceased operations in November 2019.

In January 2020, there had been many reports of an Ottawa-based team owned by Atlético Madrid being formed for the 2020 season. These reports were later confirmed when the CPL announced Atlético Ottawa as the league's first expansion team on January 29, 2020.

Saskatchewan
On March 12, 2021, the CPL conditionally awarded an expansion club to Living Sky Sports and Entertainment Inc. (LSSE), a Saskatchewan-based company. The expansion is dependent on LSSE delivering a soccer-specific stadium, and the preferred location for that stadium is Prairieland Park in Saskatoon. The team is targeting a debut of 2023 at the earliest. As of April 2021, plans called for the former horse-racing grandstand at the park to anchor the north, shorter, end of the soccer pitch, with new stands facing its other sides.

Vancouver
On November 10, 2021, the CPL officially awarded an expansion club in Vancouver to SixFive Sports and Entertainment LP. The team is set to debut in 2023. On April 13, 2022, the CPL and SixFive Sports and Entertainment LP announced that the club would begin playing in Langley, British Columbia at the Willoughby Community Park adjacent to the Langley Events Centre. On November 2, 2022, the club announced its name as Vancouver FC along with a crest and team colours.

Windsor/Essex County
On January 10, 2022, the CPL announced that commissioner David Clanachan had stepped down and was awarded exclusive expansion rights for Windsor, Ontario. In June 2022, it was revealed that Clanachan had partnered with Windsor TFC owner Vancho Cirovski, setting a launch date goal of 2026. The pair have targeted Windsor Stadium as a potential home for the club.

League champions

Two championship trophies are awarded to teams at the end of a Canadian Premier League season. The North Star Shield is given to the playoff champion and has been awarded since the league's inception. A regular season champion trophy was introduced during the 2022 CPL season and will be awarded retroactively to the points leader from each season. In addition to equal cash prizes, both champions earn a spot in the CONCACAF Champions League competing against teams from across North America, Central America and Caribbean for a spot in the FIFA Club World Cup.

CPL results by team

CPL results by year

Organization

Ownership
In April 2018, commissioner David Clanachan said that the league was looking at implementing a club-based structure for the Canadian Premier League, rather than a franchise-based system like in Major League Soccer.

League executives
On January 10, 2018, David Clanachan, former president and chief operating officer of Tim Hortons, was named as the first commissioner of the league. On January 24, he announced that Paul Beirne had been named president. Having already worked with the league for over a year, Beirne took on the role of managing the day-to-day league operations. On January 31, the Canadian Premier League named James Easton, a former Canadian international, as vice-president of Soccer Operations. On September 19, 2019, Clanachan announced that Beirne would step down as president of the CPL at the end of the 2019 season in October. On January 10, 2022, David Clanachan resigned from his position as league commissioner.

On August 25, 2022, American sports executive Mark Noonan was announced as the league's new commissioner as well as the new CEO of Canada Soccer Business effective September 1.

Players

The Canadian Premier League uses a salary cap. For players aged 21 and younger on standard contracts, only 50% of their salary counts towards the cap (up to $200,000 total). There is also a separate salary cap for coaches and technical staff.

The league also has several other rules to give Canadian players more opportunities. This includes a minimum of six Canadian starters per game and a limit of seven foreign nationals per team. Additionally, three of the domestic players must be under the age of 21 and play at least 2,000 combined minutes per season. Rosters are limited to a size of 23 players. Given the limit, most teams opt to carry only two goalkeepers, however, teams may sign an emergency goalkeeper, who does not count to the roster limit, when necessary.

The CPL and U Sports hold an annual draft for university players. Drafted student-athletes are able to play for CPL teams in the spring and summer, and return to their university team by August 15, thereby preserving their eligibility. The first CPL–U Sports Draft took place in Vancouver on November 12, 2018, after the conclusion of the U Sports men's soccer championship.

The Professional Footballers Association of Canada (PFA Canada) is the union representing CPL players. Following a members vote, PFA Canada was formally recognized by the league on December 20, 2022.

Stadiums

The Canadian Premier League has used a mix of existing, built for purpose, and upgraded stadiums, many of which are shared with other teams. IG Field (Valour FC), TD Place Stadium (Atlético Ottawa), and Tim Hortons Field (Forge FC) were existing Canadian Football League stadiums, and have the largest capacities in the CPL. York Lions Stadium (York United FC) and Westhills Stadium (Pacific FC) are both pre-existing stadiums that were upgraded in capacity before the 2019 season. ATCO Field (Cavalry FC) and Wanderers Grounds (HFX Wanderers FC) were new stadiums in 2019, built at pre-existing venues.

Broadcast rights
On February 20, 2019, it was announced that Mediapro had acquired the broadcast rights to the league. A streaming service established in 2019, OneSoccer, carries all of the league's matches, including the Canadian Championship. Twenty games throughout the inaugural season were also available through CBC Sports, ten of which were on broadcast television, and all 20 on CBC Gem and the CBC website.

CBC extended the deal with two games every Saturday during the league's second season, while CHCH also picked-up the rights for one game every Sunday. In August 2020, Fox Sports became the CPL's first American broadcast partner. The season was also aired by StarTimes in Sub-Saharan Africa, 1Sports in the Indian subcontinent, and Premier Football in the Philippines. The group stage and Final were broadcast in Latin America by DirecTV Go and Tigo Sports. From 2022, BT Sport started showing live coverage of the league across Ireland and the United Kingdom.

Records and statistics

Awards 
At the conclusion of each season, the league presents the following awards:

Golden Boot
Golden Glove
Coach of the Year
Player of the Year
Best Under 21 Canadian Player of the Year
Defender of the Year
Players' Player of the Year

See also

 Soccer in Canada
 List of soccer clubs in Canada
 Canada men's national soccer team
 List of American and Canadian soccer champions

References

External links

 
Professional sports leagues in Canada
Soccer leagues in Canada
2017 establishments in Canada
Sports leagues established in 2017